Deighton railway station serves the Deighton area of Huddersfield, West Yorkshire, England.

History
There have been two stations at Deighton, on different routes.

This station was situated on the north-east side of Whitacre Street. It closed on 28 July 1930.

The present station was opened on 26 April 1982 by Metro (the West Yorkshire Passenger Transport Executive). It is to the south-west of Whitacre Street and close to the site of the former Kirkburton branch junction.

Facilities
The station is unstaffed but has a ticket machine. Tickets must be purchased before boarding the train to benefit from any fare discounts.  There are waiting shelters on both platforms, but no other permanent buildings.  Train running information is offered via automated announcements, digital information screens and timetable posters.  Both platforms have step-free access via ramps from the nearby road.

Services 
Local trains on the Huddersfield Line operated by Northern from Huddersfield going towards Wakefield Kirkgate stop at Deighton. There is also an hourly TransPennine Express stopping service between Leeds and Huddersfield (connections are available there for stations further west). All other services go through the station at high speed without stopping.

The hourly TransPennine Express service also runs on Sunday, though the Northern trains between Huddersfield and Wakefield do not.

References

External links

Disused railway stations in Kirklees
DfT Category F2 stations
Former London and North Western Railway stations
Railway stations in Great Britain opened in 1871
Railway stations in Great Britain closed in 1930
Railway stations in Huddersfield
Railway stations opened by British Rail
Railway stations in Great Britain opened in 1982
Northern franchise railway stations
1871 establishments in England
Railway stations served by TransPennine Express